Xu Shao (150–195), courtesy name Zijiang, was a Chinese philosopher and politician who lived in the Eastern Han dynasty.

Early life and career
Xu Shao was from Pingyu County (平輿縣), Runan Commandery (汝南郡), which is present-day Pingyu County, Henan. As a youth, he maintained a good reputation and had a keen interest in the study of human relations. He was known for appraising people. His fame put him on par with others such as Fan Zizhao (樊子昭) and He Yangshi (和陽士). Xu Shao and Guo Tai (郭泰) were famous character evaluators at the time and their appraisals were highly valued among scholar-officials.

Xu Shao started his civil career as an Officer of Merit (功曹) in his home commandery. Xu Qiu (徐璆), the commandery administrator, treated him very respectfully. The other officials in the commandery office became more cautious and conservative in their manners when they heard that Xu Shao was going to be their colleague. When Yuan Shao was on his way home to Runan County after resigning from his post of Prefect (令) of Puyang County, he rode in a carriage and was surrounded by many guards and attendants. Before entering Runan, he ordered his men to leave, saying, "How can I let Xu Zijiang see me like this?" He then travelled home in a single carriage.

Appraisal of Liu Ye
While Xu Shao was at Yangzhou, he praised Liu Ye as someone with the ability to help a sovereign govern his realm.

Appraisals of Chen Shi and Chen Fan
When a teenage Xu Shao went to Yingchuan Commandery (潁川郡; covering present-day southern and central Henan), he visited and mingled with many reputable men in the region, except for Chen Shi. Later, when Chen Fan's wife died, many people attended her funeral but Xu Shao did not show up. When asked, Xu Shao replied, "Taiqiu is too well-acquainted, it's difficult for him to be thorough; Zhongju (Chen Fan's courtesy name) is a serious person who hardly makes compromises. These are the reasons why I didn't visit them."

Appraisal of Cao Cao
When Cao Cao was still relatively unknown, he prepared expensive gifts and behaved humbly when he visited Xu Shao in the hope of receiving an appraisal. Xu Shao viewed Cao Cao with contempt and refused to evaluate him, but Cao later found an opportunity to threaten and coerce Xu into giving comments about him. Xu Shao said, "You're a treacherous villain in times of peace and a hero in times of chaos." Cao Cao was very pleased and he left.

However, Sun Sheng's Yitong Zayu (異同雜語) recorded a different quote from Xu Shao. It mentioned that when Cao Cao asked Xu Shao to give him an appraisal, Xu initially refused but eventually relented and said, "You'll be a capable minister in times of peace, and a jianxiong in times of chaos." Cao Cao laughed when he heard that.

Relationships with others
Xu Shao's granduncle was Xu Jing (許敬). Xu Jing's son was Xu Xun (許訓). Xu Xun's son, Xu Xiang (許相), became one of the Three Ducal Ministers by flattering the court eunuchs. Xu Xiang invited Xu Shao to meet him numerous times, but Xu Shao despised him for being a sycophant towards the eunuchs and refused to see him.

Xu Shao was initially on good terms with Li Kui (李逵), who was from the same hometown as him and was known for his good moral conduct, but relations between them soured later. Xu Shao also could not get along with his cousin Xu Jing (許靖). These two incidents caused some damage to Xu Shao's reputation. Before falling out with each other, Xu Shao and his cousin Xu Jing were famous commentators and they would give comments on certain persons or topics on the first day of every month.

Later life and death
Yang Biao (楊彪), the Excellency of Works (司空; one of the Three Ducal Ministers), once attempted to recruit Xu Shao to serve in his office but the latter refused. Later, when the Han imperial court wanted to recruit Xu Shao again, he declined, "Villains are rampant. The political scene is about to become chaotic. I intend to seek refuge in Huaihai (淮海) and keep my family safe." He then moved south to Guangling (廣陵; around present-day Yangzhou, Jiangsu). Tao Qian, the Inspector (刺史) of Xu Province, treated Xu Shao generously, but Xu felt uneasy and he told others, "Tao Gongzu (Tao Qian) appears to enjoy a good reputation but he is actually not sincere and faithful on the inside. He may treat me very well but his attitude towards me will worsen later. I'd better leave." He then headed further south to Qu'e County (曲阿縣; present-day Danyang, Jiangsu), where he joined Liu Yao, the Inspector of Yang Province. Later, as Xu Shao predicted, Tao Qian arrested all his reputable guests.

When Sun Ce was on a series of conquests in the Wu region, Xu Shao and Liu Yao fled south to Yuzhang Commandery (豫章郡; around present-day Nanchang, Jiangxi). At the time, Zhou Shu (周術), the previous Administrator of Yuzhang Commandery, had died of illness so his office was vacant. Liu Biao, the Governor of Jing Province, supported Zhuge Xuan to be the new Administrator, but that became a problem because the Han imperial court had appointed Zhu Hao (son of Zhu Jun) to succeed Zhou Shu. While waiting at Pengze County (彭澤縣; east of present-day Hukou County, Jiangxi), Liu Yao sent Ze Rong to lead troops to attack Zhuge Xuan. Xu Shao cautioned Liu Yao, "Ze Rong doesn't care about how others see him. Zhu Wenming (Zhu Hao) is too trusting of people. You should warn him to be wary (of Ze Rong)." After driving Zhuge Xuan away, as Xu Shao foresaw, Ze Rong killed Zhu Hao and took control of Yuzhang Commandery. Later, Xu Shao died at Yuzhang the age of 46 (by East Asian age reckoning).

See also
 Lists of people of the Three Kingdoms

Notes

References

 Fan, Ye (5th century). Book of the Later Han (Houhanshu).
 Pei, Songzhi (5th century). Annotations to Records of the Three Kingdoms (Sanguozhi zhu).

150 births
195 deaths
People during the end of the Han dynasty
Han dynasty philosophers
Han dynasty politicians from Henan